The Bezirksoberliga was the seventh tier of the German football league system in the state of Bavaria from 1988 to 2012. The Bezirksoberligas have also existed in other states of Germany, like Hesse and Lower Saxony. In Hesse, they were renamed to Gruppenligas, in Lower Saxony to Landesligas. At the end of the 2011–12 season, Bavaria abolished its Bezirksoberligas, too, leaving Germany without such a league in senior men's football unless another federation would opt to rename or introduce a league.

Overview

In Niedersachsen
With the introduction of the 3. Liga and the disbanding of the Oberliga Nord in 2008, the two Verbandsligas in Niedersachsen became the highest amateur leagues for the state. Accordingly, the two leagues were renamed to Oberliga, their new names being:
 Oberliga Niedersachsen-Ost
 Oberliga Niedersachsen-West

Below the two former Verbandsligas, the four existing Bezirksoberligas now became the sixth tier of the league system. On 17 May 2010, the Lower Saxony football association decided to rename the four Bezirksoberligas to Landesligas from the 1 July 2010. This change in name came alongside the merger of the two Oberliga divisions above it into the Niedersachsenliga.

In Bavaria
In the state of Bavaria, seven Bezirksoberligas were introduced in 1988, each covering one of the seven Regierungsbezirke:
 Bezirksoberliga Schwaben
 Bezirksoberliga Oberbayern
 Bezirksoberliga Niederbayern
 Bezirksoberliga Oberpfalz
 Bezirksoberliga Mittelfranken
 Bezirksoberliga Unterfranken
 Bezirksoberliga Oberfranken

These seven leagues formed the seventh tier of the German league system in Bavaria, below the three Bavarian Landesligas. The leagues were abolished at the end of the 2011–12 season.

In Hesse
In the state of Hesse, the previously existing Bezirksoberligas have been renamed to Gruppenligas at the end of the 2007–08 season.

In Schleswig-Holstein
In the state of Schleswig-Holstein, the Landesligas were renamed to Bezirksoberligas in 1999. In 2008, the Bezirksoberligas were then renamed to Verbandsligas. Currently, there are no Bezirksoberligas in the state any more.

 References 

Sources
 Deutschlands Fußball in Zahlen,  An annual publication with tables and results from the Bundesliga to Verbandsliga/Landesliga, publisher: DSFS
 kicker Almanach,  The yearbook on German football from Bundesliga to Oberliga, since 1937, published by the kicker Sports Magazine
 Die Deutsche Liga-Chronik 1945-2005''  History of German football from 1945 to 2005 in tables, publisher: DSFS, published: 2006

External links 
 Das deutsche Fussball Archiv Historic German league tables 

 
7